Andrea A. Lunsford is an American writer and scholar who specializes in the field of composition and rhetoric studies. She is the director of the Program in Writing and Rhetoric (PWR) and the Louise Hewlett Nixon Professor of English Emerita at Stanford University. She is also a faculty member at the Bread Loaf School of English. Lunsford received her B.A. and M.A. at the University of Florida and completed her Ph.D. in English at the Ohio State University in 1977. Lunsford has served as Chair of the Conference on College Composition and Communication (CCCC), as Chair of the Modern Language Association (MLA) Division on Writing, and as a member of the MLA Executive Council.

Contributions
Lunsford, along with Lisa Ede, argues for collaborative writing and the ability for writers to work together and be rewarded for their work on the same level as singular writers. Lunsford has collaborated on researching the role of audience in composition theory and pedagogy. Lunsford, again with Ede, researched creating a common ground between addressed and invoked audiences and the idea that an elaborated view of audience must balance the creativity of the writer and the creativity of the reader. An important claim Lunsford has made in cognitivism is that cognitive mental faculties involved during composition are important. She states that the best way to encourage the writing process is through the use of workshops and discussions rather than traditional lecture styles.

Among her published books are the undergraduate textbook Everything's an Argument and the scholarly anthology Reclaiming Rhetorica: Women in the History of Rhetoric.

References

Stanford University faculty
University of Florida alumni
Ohio State University Graduate School alumni
Living people
Year of birth missing (living people)